Sergei Vladimirovich Osipov (born 4 March 1968) is a Russian professional football coach and a former player.

Playing career
He played 11 seasons in the Russian Football National League for Rubin-TAN, FC Baltika Kaliningrad, FC Irtysh Omsk and FC Lokomotiv Chita.

References

1968 births
Sportspeople from Omsk
Living people
Soviet footballers
Russian footballers
Association football defenders
FC Ural Yekaterinburg players
FC Rubin Kazan players
FC Baltika Kaliningrad players
FC Irtysh Omsk players
Russian football managers
FC Uralets Nizhny Tagil players
FC Chita players